Kochummenia is a genus of plants in the family Rubiaceae. , it contains three accepted species, all endemic to Peninsular Malaysia.

Kochummenia parviflora K.M.Wong - Terengganu
Kochummenia stenopetala (King & Gamble) K.M.Wong - Perak
Kochummenia terengganuensis K.M.Wong

References

Rubiaceae genera
Gardenieae
Endemic flora of Peninsular Malaysia